The Katharineum zu Lübeck is a humanistic gymnasium founded 1531 in the Hanseatic city Lübeck, Germany. In 2006 the 475th anniversary of this Latin school was celebrated with several events. The school uses the buildings of a former Franciscan monastery next to Saint Catherine Church, which was extended in the 1880s. 

At the Katharineum it is possible to choose Latin as the first foreign language. In year nine it is also possible to choose ancient Greek as the third foreign language.

Thomas Mann, himself a student of the Katharineum, thought of this school when describing the school Hanno went to in the Buddenbrooks. Mann, who as a bad student had to resit two years, made it clear that he disliked the Katharineum by describing both the school and the teachers with strong sarcasm. His brother Heinrich Mann described the school and one infamous teacher in Professor Unrat.

Notable students

 Blumenberg, Hans
 Carlebach, Felix
 Geibel, Emanuel
 Graba, Carl Julian
 Mann, Thomas
 Mühsam, Erich
 Overbeck, Friedrich
 Radbruch, Gustav
 Storm, Theodor
 Walther Schubring

External links
 Katharineum

Lübeck
Schools in Schleswig-Holstein
Buildings and structures in Lübeck
Educational institutions established in the 1530s
1531 establishments in the Holy Roman Empire